Yukhym, is a Ukrainian masculine given name. Notable people with the name include:

 Yukhym Konoplya (born 1999), Ukrainian footballer
 Yukhym Medvedev (1886–1938), Ukrainian Soviet politician
 Yukhym Shkolnykov (1939–2009), Ukrainian footballer and coach
 Yukhym Zvyahilsky (1933–2021), Ukrainian politician

 Ukrainian masculine given names